Neotonic Software was a San Francisco based company that produced technology for email customer support, founded by David Jeske and Brandon Long in 2001. Google acquired the company in April 2003, bringing its Trakken CRM product in-house where it was still in use as recently as March 2009.
 
The company also developed the ClearSilver web templating language and the Archive email web archive. ClearSilver is Open Source and is used by several Google products and other projects such as Trac.  The ideas behind Archive formed the basis for Google Groups.

Prior to Neotonic Software, David Jeske and Brandon Long worked together at eGroups and at Yahoo on Yahoo! Groups.  Both also attended the University of Illinois.

References

Defunct software companies of the United States
Google acquisitions
Companies established in 2001